Flatbush may refer to:

 Flatbush, Brooklyn, a neighborhood in Brooklyn, New York City
 Flatbush, Alberta, a hamlet
 Flatbush (TV series), 1979 American sitcom

See also
 Flat Bush, a suburb of Auckland, New Zealand